Steamboat Creek may refer to:

Steamboat Creek (Nevada), United States
Steamboat Creek (Oregon), United States
Steamboat Creek (South Carolina), United States